USCGC Reliance (WMEC-615) is a United States Coast Guard medium endurance cutter. She is the first of the 210' Medium Endurance Cutter Fleet and the fourth Revenue Cutter / Coast Guard Cutter to bear the name Reliance. Constructed by Todd Shipyards in Houston, Texas and commissioned in 1964, she was originally homeported in Corpus Christi, Texas. Her duties included offshore oil rig inspections, fisheries, counter drug, alien migrant interdiction, marine pollution patrols, and search and rescue. Reliance has been homeported in Yorktown, Virginia, Port Canaveral, Florida, New Castle, New Hampshire and Portsmouth, New Hampshire. As of May 2019 she is stationed at the Naval Air Station Pensacola in Pensacola, Florida.

References

External links
Reliance home page

Historic American Engineering Record in Maine
Ships of the United States Coast Guard
Reliance-class cutters
Ships built in Houston